Tha Uthen is a district (amphoe) of Nakhon Phanom province, northeastern Thailand.

Geography
Neighboring districts are (from the south clockwise) Mueang Nakhon Phanom, Phon Sawan, Si Songkhram, and Ban Phaeng of Nakhon Phanom Province. To the east across the Mekong river is the Laotian province Khammouan.

History
The original location of Muang Tha Uthen was at present-day tambon Chaiburi, then named Chai Rit Uttaburi (ไชยฤทธิ์อุตตบุรี). It was founded in 1808 by the Tai Nyo leader Thao Mo and his wife, Sunantha, who moved people from Muang Hongsavadi of present-day Laos. Thao Mo was then awarded with the title Phraya Hongsawadi.

In 1814 the temple (Wat) Sri Sunanthamaharam was built, which later was called Wat Traiphum.

In 1833, Phraya Maha Ammat, a military leader moved people from the current Lao side of Mekong River and settled them on the current Thai side of the river. Thao Prathum  was the first leader of Tha Uthen city and received the title Phra Sri Worasan.

After Phra Sri Worasan died in 1866, Phra Chamroenpholrop was promoted to be the leader of the city.

In 1870 King Mongkut assigned his son, Phra Sri Worarat, to be the leader of Tha Uthen. He died in 1899. Later the Ministry of Interior decided that the city should no longer have a royal family member as its leader, but be led by an assigned governor.

In 1907 the muang was converted into a district. Chanthima Pholdecha became the first district officer.

Administration

Central administration 
Tha Uthen is divided into nine sub-districts (tambon), which are further subdivided into 111 administrative villages (Muban).

Missing numbers are tambon which now form Phon Sawan district.

Local administration 
There are two sub-district municipalities (thesaban tambon) in the district:
 Tha Uthen consisting of sub-district Tha Uthen.
 Woen Phrabat consisting of sub-district Woen Phrabat.

There are seven subdistrict administrative organizations (SAO) in the district:
 Non Tan consisting of sub-district Non Tan.
 Tha Champa consisting of sub-district Tha Champa.
 Chaiburi consisting of sub-district Chaiburi.
 Phanom consisting of sub-district Phanom.
 Phathai consisting of sub-district Phathai.
 Ram Rat consisting of sub-district Ram Rat.
 Nong Thao consisting of sub-district Nong Thao.

References

External links
amphoe.com (Thai)

Tha Uthen